Taliouine is a town in Taroudant Province, Souss-Massa, Morocco. According to the 2004 census it has a population of 5,844. The primary language used in Taliouine is the (Berber) variety Tashelhit.

Taliouine is famous for its production of saffron and is one of the main exporters of this spice worldwide. The town celebrates Anmugar Amadal N Zafran, Le Festival International de Safran every year in winter (usually November), the season in which the saffron flower germinates.

References

Berber populated places
Municipalities of Morocco
Populated places in Taroudannt Province